Ambroise Guellec (born 26 March 1941 in Peumerit, Finistère) is a French politician and Member of the European Parliament for  Western France. He is a member of the Union for a Popular Movement, which is part of the European People's Party, and sits on the European Parliament's Committee on Regional Development.

He is a substitute for the Committee on Fisheries, a member of the delegation to the EU–Mexico Joint Parliamentary Committee, and a substitute for the delegation for relations with Mercosur.

Career
 Agricultural engineer, National Institute of Agriculture (Paris)
 Mayor of Pouldreuzic (since 1979)
 Member of the Brittany Regional Council (since 1992)
 Vice-Chairman (1992–2004)
 Member of the National Assembly for Finistère (1988–1997)
 State Secretary for the Sea (1986–1988)
 Chairman of the Committee for the Loire-Brittany basin (since 1987)
 Knight of the Legion of Honour

External links
 Official website (in French)
 European Parliament biography
 Declaration of financial interests (in French; PDF file)

1941 births
Living people
People from Finistère
MEPs for West France 2004–2009
Union for a Popular Movement MEPs